Think Africa Press is an  English-language online magazine based in London focusing on reports and analysis of current affairs from Africa. The magazine was launched in January 2011  and is edited by James Schneider. It features articles from leading African and international thinkers, on-the-spot reporters, and experts, covering aspects including politics, history, the economy, legal, society, gender, health, agriculture and environmental issues.

Format 
The magazine brings together analysis from contributors around the world, representing a range of viewpoints and opinions about Africa. . Various special features have also been compiled which include background and analysis articles, interviews, reviews, and an editorial Q&A, explaining.

The magazine brings together has a multi-national staff based in London and a global network of expert correspondents, representing a range of viewpoints and opinions about Africa. The publication uses a variety of writing styles including news articles, interviews and blogs as well as multimedia such as videos and infographics.

Notable contributors 
Desmond Tutu
Robert I. Rotberg
Mahmood Mamdani
Sarah Leah Whitson
Stephen Chan
Barbara Harrell-Bond
[Tewodros Melesse (Director General, International Planned Parenthood Federation)
Jack McConnell
Nasir El-Rufai
Neville Isdell
Joaquim Chissano
Joyce Banda

Critical reception 

The launch of Think Africa Press was well received by a number of analysts such as Dr Phil Clark from the School of Oriental and African Studies, who described it as “a long overdue source of analysis and critical commentary”. In 2013 Think Africa Press was listed in Howzit MSN's "10 African Blogs You Should Be Reading"

Technorati has ranked Think Africa Press 34th in its Top 100 World Politics blogs. In 2013 Think Africa Press’s Environment page ranked 11th in a list of the top 100 environment blogs of 2013.

Affiliations 
Think Africa Press is a partner of the African Press Association, part of The Guardian Africa network, and regularly republished on AllAfrica.com. In 2011 Think Africa Press supported the Oxford University Africa Society by sponsoring their 2011 Pan-Africanism Conference.

See also
List of African studies journals

References

External links
Think Africa Press 

2011 establishments in England
British news websites
Internet properties established in 2011
Magazines published in London
Magazines established in 2011
African news websites